The Hollywood Screenwriter Award is a category of the Hollywood Film Festival held annually since 2002.

Winners
 "†" indicates an Academy Award-winning screenplay
 "‡" indicates an Academy Award-nominated screenplay

External links

References 

Awards established in 2002
Screenwriting awards for film
Hollywood Film Awards